Shanghaied is a 1927 American silent drama film directed by and starring Ralph Ince.

Cast
 Ralph Ince as Hurricane Haley  
 Patsy Ruth Miller as Polly  
 Alan Brooks as Crawley  
 Gertrude Astor as Bessie  
 Walt Robbins as Ship's Cook  
 H.J. Jacobson as Bronson

References

Bibliography
 Quinlan, David. The Illustrated Guide to Film Directors. Batsford, 1983.

External links

1927 films
Films directed by Ralph Ince
American silent feature films
1920s English-language films
American black-and-white films
Film Booking Offices of America films
Silent American drama films
1927 drama films
1920s American films